Marie Bartáková (born 13 November 1948) is a Slovak rower. She competed in the women's quadruple sculls event at the 1976 Summer Olympics.

References

1948 births
Living people
Slovak female rowers
Olympic rowers of Czechoslovakia
Rowers at the 1976 Summer Olympics
Sportspeople from Rimavská Sobota